Ariosto Pallamano Ferrara is a women's handball club from Ferrara in Italia. Ariosto Pallamano Ferrara competes in the Serie A.

European record

Team

Current squad 

Squad for the 2016–17 season

Goalkeepers
 Paula Gambera
 Melanie Pernthaler

Wingers
RW
  Ilenia Ceso
LW 
  Giulia Burgio
  Nicoletta Marchegiani
  Anica Maria Sandri
  Flavia Spasari
Line Players 
  Sofia Belardinelli
  Alice Grossi
  Beatrice Piva

Back players
LB
  Neli Dobreva
  Margherita Stampi
CB 
  Rocio Barros
RB
  Nadja Abfalterer 
  Celeste Meccia 
  Katia Soglietti

External links

 
 EHF Club profile

Italian handball clubs
Ferrara